Das Geheimnis der Wale is a German 2010 two-part TV film directed by Philipp Kadelbach.

Plot
Anna Waldmann flies to New Zealand with her 14-year-old daughter Charlotte to join Charlotte's father Professor Johannes Waldmann, who is working as a respected whale researcher on a report commissioned by a local authority.  He is about to decide whether or not a large gas company can prospect for oil off the New Zealand coast when he is killed in a boat accident. Anna becomes suspicious and joins forces with Chris (an opponent of the company) to uncover an environmental scandal.

Cast 
 Christopher Lambert as Chris Cassell
 Veronica Ferres as Anna Waldmann
 Mario Adorf as Johannes Waldmann
 Alicia von Rittberg as Charlotte Waldmann
 Rawiri Paratene as Amiri Mamoe
 Fritz Karl as Steven Thompson
 Clemens Schick as Eric Cluster
 Sean Cameron Michael as Journalist
 Pavlína Němcová as Dr. Karuna
 Jo-Ann Strauss as Journalist

References

External links
 

2010 television films
2010 films
German television films
Television shows set in New Zealand
German-language television shows
Television series about animals
ZDF original programming
Films shot in South Africa